Alesia Stepaniuk (born 23 June 1985) is a Russian Paralympic judoka. She won one of the bronze medals in the women's 52 kg event at the 2020 Summer Paralympics held in Tokyo, Japan. She competed at the Summer Paralympics under the flag of the Russian Paralympic Committee.

She also won one of the bronze medals in the women's 52 kg event at the 2008 Summer Paralympics held in Beijing, China. At the 2012 Summer Paralympics in London, United Kingdom, she lost her bronze medal match in that same event.

References 

Living people
1985 births
Russian female judoka
Paralympic judoka of Russia
Paralympic bronze medalists for the Russian Paralympic Committee athletes
Paralympic bronze medalists for Russia
Paralympic medalists in judo
Judoka at the 2008 Summer Paralympics
Judoka at the 2012 Summer Paralympics
Judoka at the 2020 Summer Paralympics
Medalists at the 2008 Summer Paralympics
Medalists at the 2020 Summer Paralympics
Place of birth missing (living people)
21st-century Russian women